The president of the American Society of Cinematographers (ASC) is elected by its governing board. The ASC was organized on December 21, 1918, and elected its first president, Phil Rosen, the following day. Presidents of the ASC serve one-year terms. The current president is Stephen Lighthill, who has served since 2020, having previously served 2012–2013.

Past presidents

External links 

 List of Past Presidents of the ASC

References

 
Presidents